WURN-FM (107.1 FM) is a radio station broadcasting a Spanish Adult Contemporary format. Licensed to Key Largo, Florida, United States, the station serves the Miami area.  The station is currently owned by Actualidad Media Group.

References

External links

URN-FM
Radio stations established in 2014
2014 establishments in Florida